Alejandro "Álex" López Sánchez (born 11 January 1988) is a Spanish professional footballer who plays as a central midfielder for Racing de Ferrol.

Club career

Early years
Born in Ferrol, Galicia, López graduated from Racing de Ferrol's youth system, and made his professional debut on 14 May 2005 when he came on as a late substitute in a 2–2 home draw against CD Tenerife in the Segunda División. In July, he was loaned to lowly SD O Val of Tercera División. 

López returned to Racing in June 2006, and after appearing sparingly in the first part of the season (with his team now in the Segunda División B), he cancelled his contract and joined Narón BP of the fourth level.

Celta
In June 2009 he signed with RC Celta de Vigo, initially being assigned to the reserves in the third division. After scoring 13 goals with the B team, he made his official debut with the main squad on 13 June 2010, playing 14 minutes in a 2–0 away loss to Real Sociedad. On 13 February 2013, he renewed his link until 2018.

On 9 July 2015, López signed a contract extension with Celta until 2019, being immediately loaned to Sheffield Wednesday. A year later, still owned by the former, he joined Real Valladolid.

Later years
López spent the 2017–18 campaign with Sporting de Gijón also in the second tier. He appeared in only 13 competitive matches during his spell, mainly due to lower back problems.

On 28 September 2018, López joined Australian club Brisbane Roar FC on a one-year deal. Following his one season in the A-League, he returned to third-division Racing de Ferrol in June.

Career statistics

Club

References

External links

1988 births
Living people
Spanish footballers
Footballers from Ferrol, Spain
Association football midfielders
La Liga players
Segunda División players
Segunda División B players
Tercera División players
Racing de Ferrol footballers
Celta de Vigo B players
RC Celta de Vigo players
Real Valladolid players
Sporting de Gijón players
English Football League players
Sheffield Wednesday F.C. players
A-League Men players
Brisbane Roar FC players
Spain youth international footballers
Spanish expatriate footballers
Expatriate footballers in England
Expatriate soccer players in Australia
Spanish expatriate sportspeople in England
Spanish expatriate sportspeople in Australia